Port Dufferin is a rural community on the Eastern Shore of Nova Scotia, Canada, in the Halifax Regional Municipality. The community was formerly known as Salmon River and was renamed in 1899 by an Act of Parliament for Frederick Blackwood, the 1st Marquis of Dufferin and Governor General of Canada from 1872 to 1878. Settlement likely began in the early nineteenth century, and nine families lived in the area by 1827. An Anglican church began construction in the early 1840s, and was consecrated on August 11, 1852. The church was destroyed in the 1890s and a new church was built soon after, which was consecrated in late 1894. A schoolhouse was built in the 1860s. A Presbyterian church opened on March 20, 1904. A two-room school was opened in the 1940s.

Port Dufferin is situated at the mouth of Salmon River, where it empties into Beaver Harbour. Upstream from Lewiston Lake, the river segments into the West Branch and East Branch Salmon River. Downstream from the lake, the river progresses toward the southeast until it reaches its mouth at Beaver Harbour in Port Dufferin.

References

Citations

Bibliography

Communities in Halifax, Nova Scotia
General Service Areas in Nova Scotia